Margarita Flores Sánchez (born 10 December 1961) is a Mexican politician affiliated with the PRI. She currently serves as Senator of the LXII Legislature of the Mexican Congress representing Nayarit.

References

1961 births
Living people
Politicians from Sinaloa
People from Culiacán
Members of the Senate of the Republic (Mexico)
Institutional Revolutionary Party politicians
21st-century Mexican politicians
21st-century Mexican women politicians
Senators of the LXII and LXIII Legislatures of Mexico
Women members of the Senate of the Republic (Mexico)